Robert L. Smith (born May 1931) was a Republican politician from  Idaho. Smith was the 1974 Republican nominee for the United States Senate seat in Idaho. He was defeated by Democratic incumbent Frank Church.

References 

Living people
Idaho Republicans
1931 births